The Sabine Valley is a landform in northern South Island, New Zealand. Much of the Sabine Valley is forested with beech canopy. Example understory vegetation is the presence of Archeria traversii within certain mountain beech forests in the upper Sabine Valley of northern South Island, New Zealand.

Notes

References
 C. Michael Hogan. 2009. Crown Fern: Blechnum discolor, Globaltwitcher.com, ed. N. Stromberg
 Peter Wardle. 1991. Vegetation of New Zealand, Published by CUP Archive, 

Landforms of the Tasman District
Valleys of New Zealand